HMS Glasgow was a  commissioned in September 1937. She took part in the Fleet Air Arm raid that crippled the Italian Fleet at Taranto in 1940. She had the unfortunate experience of sinking two Allied ships during her wartime service, once through accidental collision and the other by gunfire after a case of mistaken identity.

Construction 

Laid down on 16 April 1935, Glasgow was launched on 20 June 1936 by Lucy Baldwin, the wife of the prime minister Stanley Baldwin. She entered service without some components of her main armament's fire control system, which were subsequently fitted at the end of that year. She commenced sea trials in the spring of 1937. Designed with a maximum speed of  she achieved  at standard displacement during her trials. She was subsequently commissioned on 9 September 1937.

Service history

Pre-war service 

Upon entering service Glasgow was allocated to the 2nd Cruiser Squadron of the Home Fleet. Her service was mostly uneventful, consisting of fleet exercises and 'flag showing'. Her most glamorous operation was when together with her sister HMS Southampton she escorted the liner Empress of Australia on the outward and the liner Empress of Britain on the return voyage carrying King George VI and Queen Elizabeth to Canada on their royal visit to the United States and Canada in May and June 1939.

Norwegian Campaign 

Glasgow remained allocated to the Home Fleet during the first year of the Second World War, under the command of Captain Frank Pegram from July 1939 to April 1940.

With war approaching, Glasgow sailed on 2 September 1939 from Grimsby to patrol off the Norwegian coast with Humber Force to intercept any German commerce raider attempting to reach the Atlantic or any blockade runner returning to Germany. While operating with the Humber Force she in company with the cruisers Southampton and Edinburgh was subjected to a heavy air attack by the Luftwaffe on 9 October 1939, but suffered no damage despite 120 bombs being dropped on the ships.

On the outbreak of war, she operated off the Scandinavian coast, and in November was off the coast of Norway with two destroyers in the hope of intercepting the German passenger ship  which had sailed from Murmansk.

On 9 April 1940, she was attacked off Bergen by Junkers Ju 88 and Heinkel He 111 aircraft and damaged by two near misses. Some minor underwater damage and a small amount of  flooding occurred further forward, probably as a result of the other bomb. In addition the forward  'A' turret was temporarily out of action. Two crew members were killed and five were wounded. After returning to Scapa Flow on 10 April for temporary repairs and transfer of the dead and wounded the ship returned to sea 22 hours later.

On 23 April Glasgow, Sheffield,  and six destroyers landed the first part of the 15th Infantry Brigade in Åndalsnes. On 29 April, she evacuated King Haakon and Crown Prince Olav of Norway, Nygaardsvold's Cabinet and part of the Norwegian gold reserves when they fled from Molde to Tromsø, escaping the advancing German forces. She then departed to the United Kingdom on 1 May, carrying among others the Minister of Foreign Affairs Halvdan Koht and the Minister of Defence Birger Ljungberg.

Mediterranean service

Whilst operating in home waters after the withdrawal from Norway, Glasgow accidentally rammed and sank the destroyer  in thick fog off Duncansby Head on 16 July 1940. Glasgow was able to rescue the majority of the destroyer's crew but unfortunately 19 lost their lives as well as two crew members of Glasgow.

Following repairs Glasgow was transferred to the Mediterranean where she was employed as a convoy escort and as a reinforcement of the 3rd Cruiser Squadron based at Alexandria. On 26 November, Glasgow,  and York escorted a supply convoy from Alexandria to Malta.

On 3 December Glasgow was attacked by Italian aircraft while anchored in Suda Bay, Crete. She was hit by two torpedoes fired by a Savoia-Marchetti SM.79 flown by Carlo Emanuele Buscaglia. The torpedoes struck far forward and aft, the latter putting two of her propeller shafts out of service. Other than that she received only moderate damage. She was able to return to Alexandria, where as the shipyard did not have the resources and capability to make a full repair, she was repaired to a level that allowed her to return to secondary duties.

Far East service

As a result of her diminished capability Glasgow was allocated to the Indian Ocean, leaving Alexandria on 12 February 1941 and passing through the Suez Canal. On 18 February she joined East Indies Fleet at Aden. In February the  sank the freighters Canadian Cruiser and Rantaupandjang in the Indian Ocean. Both managed to transmit distress signals, that were picked up by Glasgow, which deployed in search of the German ship. On 22 January, Admiral Scheer was sighted by the spotter aircraft from Glasgow, the East Indies Task Force was deployed to the reported area. However, Admiral Scheer had escaped by turning away to the southeast and further searches were in vain. The town was taken after only slight Italian resistance, which was soon broken by naval gunfire from Glasgow and the other escorts.

Prabhavati was alongside the lighters and was mistaken for a surfaced Japanese submarine. Glasgow picked up the survivors and took them to Bombay, arriving there later that day.

On 19 March 1942, Glasgow escorted convoy WS-16 from the UK to South Africa. In April Glasgow again underwent temporary repairs, this time in Simonstown, South Africa. She subsequently sailed to the US for permanent repairs at the Brooklyn Navy Yard from 6 May onwards. As well as repairing the damage from her 1940 torpedo attack, additional 20 mm Oerlikon cannons were added to improve her close range anti-aircraft capability. It was also decided to improve her radar suite by replacing her existing Type 286M radar with the new Type 271, while a Type 284 fire-control radar to control her main armament, type 285 and 282 aircraft warning fire-control and Type 281 aircraft warning radars were installed.

Following the completion of her shipyard work, she returned to the UK in August to complete work on her radar installations at Portsmouth. On 3 September she joined the 10th Cruiser Squadron at Scapa Flow where she was assigned to covering forces for the Arctic convoys.

In the Arctic and home waters 

Glasgow escorted Arctic convoys between January and February 1943. In March she intercepted the German blockade runner Regensburg in the Denmark Strait as it returned from the Far East with valuable rubber, tungsten and other commodities. Her crew managed to scuttle the ship, but most of the crew drowned in the heavy seas while abandoning her, with Glasgow being able to recover only six survivors. During June and July she supplied cover for escort groups in the Bay of Biscay.

Between August and September she entered the HM Dockyard at Devonport where her aircraft facilities were removed and additional 20 mm weapons were installed in order to improve her air defences. Her radar was improved by fitting a new Fire-Control Type 283. The opportunity was also taken to install IFF equipment and VHF radio-telephone outfits. Upon completion of her refit she was transferred to join the Commander-in-Chief, Plymouth.

In December 1943 she formed part of Operation Stonewall, the interception of German blockade runners. In late December, Glasgow and the cruiser  in the Battle of the Bay of Biscay fought a three-hour battle with eleven German destroyers and torpedo boats of which three were sunk and four damaged by gunfire. After this engagement Glasgow returned to Plymouth in spite of several air raids where glider bombs were used.

On 6 June 1944 Glasgow was part of Operation Neptune, (the Normandy landings). On 25–26 June, in support of the attack by the 7th US Corps on Cherbourg, she shelled the German batteries near Querqueville. During this exchange of fire Glasgow was hit and damaged. In August 1945 she set sail for the East Indies, where she was the flagship of the Commander-in-Chief.

Modernisation 

With the demand for cruisers in the European theatre decreasing it was decided to withdraw Glasgow and modernise her in preparation for the ongoing war in the Pacific. Entering a shipyard on the River Tyne on 3 July 1944 her aft 6-inch turret ('X') was removed to compensate for the additional weight of adding the more powerful anti-aircraft armament needed to counter the threat of kamikaze attacks. The space freed by the removal of the aft turret was used to mount two quad 40 mm Bofors guns. New radar systems were fitted including a single aerial air warning Type 281B (which replaced an earlier twin mast Type 281), a surface warning Type 293 (which replaced the existing Type 273), while the main armament's Type 284 gunnery radar was replaced by a Type 274.  She was also fitted with a US made YE homing beacon to help her undertake the high risk role of a radar picket. The beacon issued coded directions to Allied aircraft returning from missions, which would allow Glasgow to be stationed on an outer screen around the main fleet to separate Allied aircraft from accompanying enemy aircraft and so destroy enemy aircraft before they reached the fleet. The modernisation was completed on 29 June 1945. She then spent July working up for operational war service.

Postwar 

On 22 August 1945 Glasgow set out with HMS Jamaica for the East Indies as acting flagship. She transferred to the Indian Ocean arriving in Colombo on 5 October to relieve HMS Phoebe as the flagship of 5th Cruiser Squadron. After serving for two years in the Indian Ocean Glasgow returned to Portsmouth and was placed in the Reserve. Following a refit she was re-commissioned in September 1948 and deployed to the America and West Indies Station, where she was the flagship. She attended the Halifax bicentenary celebrations in Nova Scotia in 1949, returning to the UK in October 1950.

She was then refitted at Chatham in 1951 before becoming in 1952 the flagship of the Mediterranean Fleet based at Malta under Admiral the Earl Mountbatten of Burma. In 1953, she took part in the film Sailor of the King. In the same year she took part in the Fleet Review to celebrate the Coronation of Queen Elizabeth II.

She was still in the Mediterranean Fleet when together with HMS Gambia she participated in August 1954 in the withdrawal of 40 Commando Royal Marines from Port Said.

In 1955 Glasgow returned to the UK, and in May 1955 onwards rejoined the Home Fleet as flagship of the Flag Officer D (Flotillas) before being paid off at Portsmouth in November 1956. The Suez crisis in 1956 caused Glasgow to be temporarily re-commissioned.

Decommissioning and disposal 
After the Suez Crisis it was decided that Glasgow was surplus to requirements and was paid off in November 1956. The warship was placed on the disposal list in March 1958 and was sold to BISCO for demolition. Departing Portsmouth on 4 July Glasgow arrived under tow on 8 July at Hughes Bolckow's yard in Blyth for breaking up.

Notes

References

External links 

 BBC.co.uk Royal Navy: HMS Glasgow

 

Town-class cruisers (1936)
Ships built on the River Clyde
1936 ships
World War II cruisers of the United Kingdom
Cold War cruisers of the United Kingdom
Maritime incidents in July 1940
Maritime incidents in June 1944